The Goa Inquisition, Being a Quatercentenary Commemoration Study of the Inquisition in India is a book published by Mumbai University Press and authored by Anant Priolkar. It is a narrative of the Goan Inquisition organised by the Portuguese rulers of Goa.

Details
The book is divided into two parts. Part I, titled "The Goa Inquisition", is divided into ten chapters. The first two chapters detail the Spanish Inquisition and Portuguese Inquisition in Europe providing background material and context that would lead to the inquisition in India. A fictional story of unrequited love is used as the basis for the anti-Semitism of Tomas de Torquemada . The book also makes the origin of the Portuguese Inquisition based on the love of King Manuel I of Portugal for Princess Isabella of Aragon, instead of politics. (The arrival of Jews to Portugal after their expulsion from Spain was a security threat to the Kingdom of Portugal, because Sephardic Jews had an established reputation in Iberia for joining forces with Moors to overthrow Christian rulers.)

Chapter 3 begins with the advent of the Inquisition in India, with a discussion of the French spy Dellon's account of the inquisition in Chapter 4. The successive chapters describe the wars that led to the establishment of Portuguese rule in Goa, and the  fictional massacre of Hindus during the Portuguese conquest of Goa in 1510. (Only the Bijapur Muslims were killed during the conquest, by both the Portuguese led by Afonso de Albuquerque and the local Hindus led by Timoji.)
 
Successive chapters in Part I also describe the forced conversion of Hindus to Christianity by the Goa Inquisition. Thus the book completely contradicts contemporary historical accounts of voluntary conversions of entire villages in Goa by the various religious orders (Dominicans, Jesuits and Franciscans), but the book doesn't provide any contemporary basis for its version of history. The book details the organization and procedures of the Inquisition and the anti-Hindu laws that were passed in Goa during the inquisition banning Hindu religious ceremonies and customs from being continued by converted Hindus, as well as reducing the status of Hindus to second-class citizens by banning them from public gatherings and so on.

The book also discusses the various methods of torture used by the Inquisition, such as burning by sulphur, water-torture, rape, the use of pulleys to stretch victims and the "strappado" method of torture. The investigation of Agostino Borromeo from the University of La Sapienza in Roma into the Vatican archives and the subsequent 783-page report has revealed that this part of Priolkar's book is completely baseless.

Part II discusses the accounts of the Inquisition given by Dellon and Buchanan in two separate chapters. Priolkar cites Buchanan as an authoritative source, although Buchanan's work was a Protestant polemic written in the 19th century that denounced Catholicism in Goa and it did not use any historical records.

Editions 
 Priolkar, A.K 1961, "The Goa Inquisition, Being a Quatercentenary Commemoration Study of the Inquisition in India", Bombay University.

References

1961 non-fiction books
Books about India
History books about Hinduism
History books about Christianity
Indian non-fiction books
Voice of India books
History of Catholicism in Asia
History of Goa
Portuguese Inquisition
Portuguese India
Books about antisemitism
Early Modern Christian anti-Judaism
Anti-Hindu sentiment
Jewish Indian history
Jewish Portuguese history
Jewish Spanish history
20th-century Indian books
Antisemitism in Asia
Books about Catholicism
Anti-Islam sentiment in India